This is a list of manifestos written by mass killers explaining their motives for killings. Many of them have committed the killings to propagate their views.

List

Analysis 
According to 2020 analysis of 17 mass shooters' manifestos common themes appearing in them are: narcissism, threats to masculinity, paranoia, fame, suicide ideation, and
revenge. 2017 analysis found following themes in mass murderers manifestos: ego survival and revenge; pseudocommando mindset: persecution, obliteration; envy; nihilism; entitlement; and heroic revenge fantasy.

External links 
 NPR: Understanding The Statements Of Mass Shooters, 7 August 2019

References